The following lists events in the year 1998 in China.

Incumbents
Party General Secretary: Jiang Zemin
President: Jiang Zemin
Premier: Li Peng (until 17 March), Zhu Rongji (starting 17 March)
Vice President: Rong Yiren (until March 12), Hu Jintao (starting March 15)
Vice Premier: Zhu Rongji (until March 17) Li Lanqing (starting March 17)

Governors  
 Governor of Anhui Province – Hui Liangyu then Wang Taihua 
 Governor of Fujian Province – He Guoqiang 
 Governor of Gansu Province – Sun Ying then Song Zhaosu 
 Governor of Guangdong Province – Lu Ruihua 
 Governor of Guizhou Province – Wu Yixia then Qian Yunlu 
 Governor of Hainan Province – Ruan Chongwu then Wang Xiaofeng 
 Governor of Hebei Province – Ye Liansong then Yue Qifeng
 Governor of Heilongjiang Province – Tian Fengshan 
 Governor of Henan Province – Ma Zhongchen then Li Keqiang 
 Governor of Hubei Province – Jiang Zhuping 
 Governor of Hunan Province – Yang Zhengwu then Chu Bo 
 Governor of Jiangsu Province – Zheng Silin then Ji Yunshi
 Governor of Jiangxi Province – Shu Shengyou 
 Governor of Jilin Province – Wang Yunkun then Hong Hu 
 Governor of Liaoning Province – Wen Shizhen (until January), Zhang Guoguang (starting January)
 Governor of Qinghai Province – Bai Enpei 
 Governor of Shaanxi Province – Cheng Andong 
 Governor of Shandong Province – Li Chunting
 Governor of Shanxi Province – Sun Wensheng 
 Governor of Sichuan Province – Song Baorui 
 Governor of Yunnan Province – Li Jiating 
 Governor of Zhejiang Province – Chai Songyue

Events
9th National People's Congress
Launch of the Three Stresses campaign
June–September – 1998 Yangtze River floods
June 23 – Chenggu axe massacre
November 11 – Tencent founded.
November 19 – 1998 Ninglang earthquake

Births
 January 10 - Xu Shilin, tennis player
 March 1 – Chen Yufeng, badminton player
 December 16 - Zhou Jieqiong, singer and actress, member of I.O.I and Pristin

Culture
List of Chinese films of 1998

Sport
January 18–24 – 1998 Four Nations Tournament (women's football), in Guangzhou
March 15–21 – 1998 IIHF Asian Oceanic Junior U18 Championship, in Harbin
Chinese Jia-A League season: Chinese Jia-A League 1998
China at the 1998 Asian Games
China at the 1998 Winter Olympics won a total of 8 medals

References

 
China
Years of the 20th century in China
1990s in China
China